Nickelodeon was a Japanese television channel which was targeted mainly at children, teens and adults, operated by ViacomCBS Networks Japan K.K. (a subsidiary of ViacomCBS Networks EMEAA division of ViacomCBS). It originally launched in November 1998 as a cable and satellite television channel, but due to declining viewership, the television channel was taken off the air on September 30, 2009. The channel was revived for OTT media services from January 30, 2018 to January 31, 2022.

History 
Nickelodeon launched on DirecTV channel 272 on November 15, 1998 in Japan. The withdrawal of DirecTV from Japan led to Nickelodeon moving to SKY PerfecTV! channel 278 on October 1, 2000. In January 2006, Nickelodeon switched to telecommunications service utilization broadcasting, and moved to channel 751 on SKY PerfecTV! while also being available on select cable providers. The channel was renewed in October 2006.

Nickelodeon stopped broadcasting on September 30, 2009 due to robust domestic and international competition. Viacom continued to distribute select Nickelodeon series to its other networks (including MTV Japan), DTH satellite channels, and terrestrial television networks. NHK Educational TV, which had already been airing SpongeBob SquarePants, premiered The Penguins of Madagascar and iCarly in 2010. Nickelodeon's programs were also broadcast on Animax in Japan under a television block titled "NickTime", starting with SpongeBob SquarePants from September 1, 2010. The official Nickelodeon website remained online, with program information, website games and downloadable content.

On October 18, 2017, Viacom announced it would re-launch the Nickelodeon channel on dTV (a subscription TV streaming service of NTT Docomo). Nickelodeon re-launched on dTV and Hulu Japan on January 30, 2018. An official Facebook account opened on April 20. The Nickelodeon channel launched on Amazon Prime Video on July 3. Nickelodeon was available on music.jp from March 15, 2019 to January 31, 2021. On April 28, 2021, Rakuten TV began offering Nick+, a collection of Nickelodeon programs available for 440 yen per month. On January 31, 2022, the linear Nickelodeon channel was discontinued. The following day, Nickelodeon renewed its video-on-demand distribution agreement with Amazon Prime Video. Some of the network's series continue to broadcast through separate syndication deals with Japanese broadcasters.

References

External links 
  (In Japanese)

Japan
Television stations in Japan
Children's television channels in Japan
Television channels and stations established in 1998
Television channels and stations disestablished in 2009
Television channels and stations established in 2018
Television channels and stations disestablished in 2022
Re-established companies
Japanese-language television stations
1998 establishments in Japan
2009 disestablishments in Japan
2018 establishments in Japan
2022 disestablishments in Japan
Hulu Japan